This is the list of world records in track para-cycling.

Men's records
 denotes a performance that is also a current Paralympic record.  Statistics are correct as of 22 October 2022.

Women's records
 denotes a performance that is also a current Paralympic record.  Statistics are correct as of 20 October 2022.

Mixed records

References

External links
 Para-cycling world records – Men 
 Para-cycling world records – Women 

Track cycling records